Christian Lagerwaard (born Christian Dirk Lagerwaard, 15 October 1964) is a Dutch fashion designer. He has his own Fashion Label (Christian Lagerwaard) under which he has previously worked for the Royal Dutch Family, Princess Laurentien of the Netherlands in particular.

References

External links
 

Living people
1964 births
Dutch fashion designers